Vaticanus may refer to:

 Vatican Hill (in Latin, Vaticanus Mons), a location of Holy See
 Vagitanus or Vaticanus, an Etruscan god

See also 
 Codex Vaticanus (disambiguation)